Laguna de Leche (Spanish for "Milk Lagoon", also called Laguna Grande de Morón) is the largest natural fresh water lake in Cuba.

Overview
The white color is caused by the lake's limestone bed. Natural movements of the sea level cause disturbances in the water table, which releases lime particles from the lake bed into the water.

A channel built in 1940 (Chicola Channel) connected the lake to the Bay of Buena Vista, allowing for the sugar processed in Morón to reach the small port of Chicola. In the process, the lake was contaminated with sea water, and it lost its characteristic white color. The channel was closed in 1988, and the milky color gradually recovered.

The Caribbean flamingo finds a natural habitat in the lake and its islands

See also
Chicola

References

Geography of Ciego de Ávila Province
Morón, Cuba
Leche